Little Mirchi Thoda Pepper is an Indian television Hindi language comedy series aired on Zee TV channel in 2000. The story portrays the challenges that a man faces in his daily life, and how these challenges can be a big hurdle. The story of the series is written by an Indian director/actor, Saurabh Shukla and his wife Barnali Shukla.

Cast
Gauri Karnik
Vikram Gokhale
Suchitra Pillai
Rajat Kapoor
Haiku Chandna

References

Zee TV original programming
Indian television series
2000 Indian television series debuts
2000 Indian television series endings